The rose subfamily Rosoideae consists of more than 850 species, including many shrubs, perennial herbs, and fruit plants such as strawberries and brambles. Only a few are annual herbs.

The circumscription of the Rosoideae is still not wholly certain; recent genetic research has resulted in several changes at the genus level and the removal from Rosoideae of some genera (notably Cercocarpus, Cowania, Dryas and Purshia) previously included in the subfamily.

Genera

 Acaena – bidibidis
 Agrimonia – agrimonies
 Alchemilla – lady's mantles
 Aphanes – parsley-pierts (sometimes in Alchemilla)
 Aremonia
 Argentina – silverweeds (sometimes in Potentilla)
 Bencomia
 Chamaerhodos Bunge – little-rose
 Cliffortia
 Coluria
 Comarum (formerly in Potentilla)
 Dasiphora – woody cinquefoils (formerly in Potentilla)
 Dendriopoterium (currently in Sanguisorba)
 Drymocallis – sticky cinquefoils (formerly in Potentilla)
 Duchesnea - mock strawberry (formerly in Potentilla)
 Fallugia
 Filipendula
 Fragaria – strawberries
 Geum – avenses
 Hagenia – African redwood
 Horkelia – horkelias (sometimes in Potentilla)
 Horkeliella – false horkelias (sometimes in Potentilla)
 Ivesia – mousetails (sometimes in Potentilla)
 Leucosidea – oldwood
 Marcetella
 Margyricarpus – pearlfruit
 Polylepis
 Potaninia
 Potentilla – typical cinquefoils (including Duchesnea)
 Poteridium
 Poterium
 Purpusia (sometimes in Potentilla )
 Rosa – roses
 Rubus – brambles
 Sanguisorba – burnets
 Sarcopoterium
 Sibbaldia
 Sibbaldianthe
 Sibbaldiopsis – three-toothed cinquefoil (formerly in Potentilla)
 Sieversia
 Spenceria
 Tetraglochin
 Waldsteinia (sometimes in Geum)

References

External links

 
Rosid subfamilies